Adrianus "Aad" Nuis (18 July 1933 – 8 November 2007) was a Dutch politician of the Democrats 66 (D66) party and political scientist.

Nuis completed his military service in New Guinea, and after spending time in Jamaica returned to the Netherlands, where he became part of the anti-monarchist movement. In the 1970s he worked as a literary critic for the Haagse Post. He became more involved in politics in the D66 party.

He served in the States-Provincial of Gelderland between 7 June 1978 and 10 June 1981. He served as Secretary of State for Culture and Media and Minister of Education, Culture and Science in the 1990s.

Nuis was also active as poet, author and translator. His first poetry book Twee schelven hooi was published in 1968, and Nuis was elected to the Maatschappij der Nederlandse Letterkunde. After retiring from politics, he mainly focused on literature and books. In 2000 Nuis became the Chairman of the Dutch Literary Production and Translation Fund, and between 2001 and 2007 Nuis was Chairman of the Koninklijke Vereniging van het Boekenvak (KVB), the organization which represents all recognized Dutch publishers and booksellers. As Chairman of the KVB, Nuis played a leading role in ensuring fixed prices for books, which resulted in the passing of the Law Fixed Book Prices of 2004.

Decorations

References

External links

Official
  Drs. A. (Aad) Nuis Parlement & Politiek
  Drs. A. Nuis (D66) Eerste Kamer der Staten-Generaal
Other
 Aad Nuis at Digital Library for Dutch Literature (in Dutch - De balenkraai. Kroniek uit Oudnederlands Guinea available for free download)

 

1933 births
2007 deaths
Democrats 66 politicians
Dutch corporate directors
Dutch essayists
20th-century Dutch journalists
Dutch literary critics
Dutch magazine editors
Dutch male poets
Dutch newspaper editors
Dutch nonprofit directors
Dutch nonprofit executives
Dutch philologists
Dutch political commentators
Knights of the Order of Orange-Nassau
Members of the House of Representatives (Netherlands)
Members of the Provincial Council of Gelderland
Members of the Senate (Netherlands)
People from Sliedrecht
Politicians from The Hague
Reformed Churches Christians from the Netherlands
State Secretaries for Education of the Netherlands
University of Amsterdam alumni
Academic staff of the University of Amsterdam
Academic staff of the University of Groningen
20th-century Dutch male writers
20th-century Dutch poets
20th-century Dutch politicians
21st-century Dutch male writers
21st-century Dutch poets
20th-century philologists